Walt or Walter Kelly may refer to:

Walter C. Kelly (1873–1939), American vaudeville comedian, uncle of Grace Kelly
Walter F. Kelly (1874–1961), American football player and football, basketball and baseball coach
Walt Kelly (1913–1973), American animator and creator of comic strip Pogo
Walter Kelly (footballer) (born 1929), Scottish centre forward

See also
Walter Kelley (disambiguation)
Raymond Walter Kelly (born 1941), American police commissioner in New York City a/k/a Ray Kelly